Arroyo Grande High School (AGHS) is an American public high school located in Arroyo Grande, California. It serves grades 9–12 as part of the Lucia Mar Unified School District (LMUSD).

Campus

The majority of classrooms are arranged in rows, starting with the 100s wing at the front of the school, and the 800 wing at the back of the school. The athletic fields bisect the school. The eastern portion of the school contains the 900 wing, or "Orchard" as it is called due to its proximity to Orchard Avenue. The 100 wing is primarily school administration. The 200s and 300s are mostly for social sciences and humanities. The 400s and 500s are where most language courses are taught. 600s and 700s are where the technical and scientific courses are held. The 800 wing contains the Inquiry Center, school farm, and other industrial, technology, occupational skills courses and additional science classes. The 900s are home to mathematics, business, foreign language and arts courses.

The Inquiry Center is the school's library, which also accommodates a variety of electronic data acquisition tools, including remote access data retrieval, CD-ROM compact disks, and a multiple user computer network.

2005–2008 renovation project

In 2004, local voters passed a school bond, Measure A-04. Its objective was "to repair, upgrade, equip and construct school facilities at Arroyo Grande High School, including the school library and restrooms, upgrade electrical wiring to accommodate technology, install energy efficient heating/ventilation systems, classrooms, cafeterias, plumbing, qualify for State matching funds, reduce overcrowding, by issuing $21,350,000 of bonds at legal interest rates, appoint a Citizens' Oversight Committee and perform annual audits to ensure that no bond money is wasted or used for administrator's salaries".

The Citizen's Oversight Committee oversaw the project. The first phase, in 2005, involved renovation of restrooms and drainage systems, and extensive renovation of the 500 wing of classrooms. In 2006, the other classroom wings on the Valley Road side of campus were renovated, and a new swimming pool was completed on the old tennis court site. The third phase included a new administration and student support center, and a new multi-purpose room with food services. The old administration building was demolished, with the administrative staff temporarily relocated to a building across from the library. The final phase involved new tennis courts, a food court, and a parking area located in a section of campus previously used by the maintenance department and some old classrooms that were removed. The construction was completed in September 2008.

Extracurricular activities

Sports

Arroyo Grande High School competes in the CIF Central Section in the Mountain League and is a member of the Central Coast Athletic Association.

AGHS, along with its peers in San Luis Obispo County and northern Santa Barbara County (Santa Maria), moved from the Southern Section of the CIF into the Central Section in January 2017 (actually starting to play there as members beginning in August 2018), approved by 38 Central Section athletic directors.

Sports at Arroyo Grande High School include

CIF Southern Section Championships 

 Boys Cross Country: 1988 (Div. 2-A)
 Boys Golf: 2013, 2014 (Central Coast Division)
 Boys Tennis: 2013 (Div. 3)
 Boys Track & Field: 1989 (Div. 2-A), 1994, 1995, 2000 (Div. II)
 Football: 1987 (Northwestern Division), 1994 (Div. VII), 1997 (Div. III), 1998 (Div. IV), 2011 (Western Div.)
 Girls Basketball: 2012 (Div. 3AAA)
 Girls Cross Country: 1984, 1985, 1987 (Div. 3-A), 1990 (Div. I-A)
 Girls Tennis: 2013 (Div. 3)
 Girls Track & Field: 1985 (Div. 2-A)
 Girls Volleyball: 1990, 1991 (Div. 2-A)
 Girls Water Polo: 2008, 2009, 2010 (Div. IV), 2015 (Div. 3)
 Wrestling: 1999, 2001 (Tournament Div. IV)

CIF Southern California Regional Titles 

 Boys Basketball: 2020 (Div. III)

CIF State Titles 

 Boys Track & Field: 2001 (28 points, Hughes Stadium)

Notable alumni

Athletes
 Seth Jacobs, class of 2012 - Oklahoma State linebacker
 Mickey Jannis, class of 2006 - Major League Baseball pitcher
 Thornton Lee, class of 1925 - Major League Baseball player
 Mark Lewis, class of 2004 - Arena Football League player 
Bryan Jones, class of 1994 - 5th round pick, 1999 NFL Draft (Miami Dolphins) 
 Jamie Martin, class of 1988 - National Football League player
 Garrett Owens, class of 2012 - Iowa State placekicker
 Louie Quintana, class of 1991 - Oregon State head track & field coach
 Sean Shields, class of 2001 - Arizona Wildcats Hall of Fame inductee
 Stephanie Brown Trafton, class of 1998 - 2008 Olympic gold medalist in discus
 Brent VanderVeen, class of 2012 - Oregon State quarterback

Business, Technology and Media
 Chris Burkard, class of 2004 — action photographer and 2010 overall winner of Red Bull Illume Photo Contest
 Randall Pitchford, class of 1989 — video game creator (Duke Nukem 3D, Halo: Combat Evolved, Brothers in Arms (video game), Borderlands (video game))

Performers
 Zac Efron, class of 2006 — actor
 Aaron Metchik, class of 1998 — acting coach and actor (The Torkelsons)
 Harry Shum Jr., class of 2000  — actor (Glee; Shadowhunters)

See also
 Lucia Mar Unified School District
 San Luis Obispo County high schools

References

External links
 California School Directory entry 
 California Department of Education DataQuest Report 
 Table of 2007–08 School Level Data
 Great Schools profile
 AGHSReunions alumni wiki and reunion information 

High schools in San Luis Obispo County, California
Education in Arroyo Grande, California
Public high schools in California
1890 establishments in California